Luther Jeralds (August 20, 1938 – December 13, 1992) was an American football defensive end. He played for the Dallas Texans in 1961 and for the Edmonton Eskimos in 1963.

References

1938 births
1992 deaths
American football defensive ends
North Carolina Central Eagles football players
Kansas City Chiefs players
Edmonton Elks players
Players of American football from North Carolina
People from Robeson County, North Carolina